Simon Nilsson (born 1 July 1992) is a Swedish footballer who plays as a right midfielder for IK Tord.

References

External links
Simon Nilsson at SvFF

1992 births
Living people
Association football midfielders
Mjällby AIF players
IFK Värnamo players
Örgryte IS players
Assyriska IK players
Allsvenskan players
Superettan players
Swedish footballers